Nandayure is a canton in the Guanacaste province of Costa Rica. The head city is in Carmona district.

History 
Nandayure was created on 9 October 1961 by decree 2826.

On September 5, 2012, Nandayure was struck by a magnitude 7.6 earthquake, destroying houses in the canton.

Geography 
Nandayure has an area of  km² and a mean elevation of  metres.

The canton encompasses a piece of the coastline of the Gulf of Nicoya near the mouth of the Tempisque River, including Berrugate Island. It cuts across the center of the Nicoya Peninsula to the Pacific coast between the Ora River to the north and the Bongo River to the south.

Districts 
The canton of Nandayure is subdivided into the following districts:
 Carmona
 Santa Rita
 Zapotal
 San Pablo
 Porvenir
 Bejuco

Demographics 

For the 2011 census, Nandayure had a population of  inhabitants.

Transportation

Road transportation 
The canton is covered by the following road routes:

References 

Cantons of Guanacaste Province
Populated places in Guanacaste Province